Ticonderoga may refer to :

Places in the United States
Ticonderoga, New York, a town
Ticonderoga (CDP), New York, a hamlet and census-designated place within the town
Fort Ticonderoga, a fortification in New York

Ships
, five naval vessels of the US Navy
Ticonderoga class, a variant of the US Navy Essex-class aircraft carrier
Ticonderoga-class cruiser
Ticonderoga (clipper) 
Ticonderoga (steamboat), a museum ship belonging to the Shelburne Museum, formerly operated on Lake Champlain
Ticonderoga II, formerly of the Lake George Steamboat Company
Ticonderoga, a 72-foot ketch, built in 1936

Other uses
Battle of Ticonderoga (disambiguation)
Ticonderoga Publications, an Australian independent publishing house
Ticonderoga High School, Ticonderoga, New York
Ticonderoga station, an Amtrak train station in Ticonderoga, New York
Ticonderoga, a 2006 album by Morning 40 Federation
Dixon Ticonderoga, an American office and art supplies manufacturer

See also